The Hiram Griggs House is a historic house located at 111 Prospect Terrace in the vicinity of Altamont, Albany County, New York.

Description and history 
Built in 1873 by Robert L. Zeh, it is a two-story, Italianate-style frame dwelling that is five bays wide and two bays deep, standing on a limestone foundation. It is named for its original owner Hiram Griggs (1836-1909) who is historically significant as the first mayor of the village of Altamont, holding that position for eight consecutive one-year terms.

It was listed on the National Register of Historic Places on July 19, 2010.

References

Houses on the National Register of Historic Places in New York (state)
Italianate architecture in New York (state)
Houses completed in 1873
Houses in Albany County, New York
National Register of Historic Places in Albany County, New York